Siegfried was a "wolfpack" of German U-boats that operated during the battle of the Atlantic in World War II.

Service history

Siegfried was formed in  October 1943 to operate  against the North Atlantic convoy routes and comprised 18 boats.
It consisted of seven boats from the disbanded group Schlieffen, plus eleven others from bases in France and Germany. All the reinforcements were commanded by new skippers; six from Norway were also new boats, while the five from France were experienced boats with new commanders.
The Siegfried boats had fuel problems, so a re-fueling group was established north of the Azores, of three tankers and a flak boat as escort.

Siegfried was deployed to intercept east-bound convoys in mid-Atlantic, planning to attack while travelling towards the re-fueling group and home bases in France. However the Allies became aware of Siegfrieds position, and diverted their east-bound  HX and SC convoys out of harm's way, leaving a massively re-inforced west-bound convoy, ON 207 to run into Siegfried as bait.
Two Siegfried boats ( and ) and one tanker were destroyed and the flak boat was damaged and forced to return to base.

Siegfried was re-configured after these actions to form three sub-groups (Siegfried 1-3) and spread a wider net; further re-arrangements followed throughout November and December. None of these were successful, as the Allies were able to divert convoys around the patrol lines or steer through the gaps.

U-boats involved

Re-fueling group
 (U-tanker)
 (Type XB provisional tanker)
 (Type XB provisional tanker)
 (Flak boat)

The name

Siegfried was named for the legendary German hero Siegfried whose story is told in the Nibelungenlied

References
Hitler's U-Boat War [Volume 2]: The Hunted 1942–1945 (1998)  (2000 UK paperback ed.)
Paul Kemp  : U-Boats Destroyed  ( 1997). 
Axel Neistle  : German U-Boat Losses during World War II  (1998).

External links

Wolfpacks of 1943
Wolfpack Siegfried